Robertsonville may refer to:
 a former name of White Sulphur Springs, New York
 a former village that is now part of Thetford Mines, Quebec, Canada